Nandu M. Natekar (British Raj, 12 May 1933 – 28 July 2021) was an Indian badminton national champion.

Career 
Natekar won over 100 national and international titles for India in a career spanning 15 years. Natekar was the first Indian to win a title abroad, in 1956. Natekar was a director of Natekar Sports and Fitness (NSF).

He won the Men's Doubles National Championship a total of six times, Men's Singles National Championship a total of six times, and Mixed Doubles National Championship a total of five times.

He was an alumnus of Ramnarain Ruia College, Mumbai. His son, Gaurav Natekar, is a seven-time Indian National Champion in tennis.

Natekar died in Pune on 28 July 2021 at the age of 88.

Achievements 
Won National level Men's Singles and Doubles Championship, as well as Mixed Doubles, multiple times in India.
He has reached the last 8 in the All England Championships.
Included among 'the Greats' in a souvenir published by Malaysia during the Thomas Cup series in 1954–55.
Men’s Singles Champion in the Selangor International Tournament in Kuala Lumpur in 1956. His victory was also the first international victory by an Indian badminton player.
Recipient of the first Arjuna Award instituted in 1961.
Voted the most popular sportsperson of India in 1961.
Natekar and Meena Shaw won the Mixed Doubles title at Bangkok’s King’s Cup International Tournament in 1962. Won the Men’s Singles title at the same event in 1963.
Represented India at the Commonwealth Games in Jamaica in 1966.
Awarded Meritorious Service Award by the IBF in 1989.
Honoured at the Jagatik Marathi Parishad in Mauritius in 1991.
Awarded Life-time Achievement Award by the Petroleum Sports Control Board of India in January 2001.
Awarded Sahyadri Navratna Puraskar in 2002, titled Ratna Saurabh.

References

External links 

1933 births
2021 deaths
Indian male badminton players
Indian national badminton champions
Recipients of the Arjuna Award
Racket sportspeople from Mumbai
Marathi sportspeople
Commonwealth Games competitors for India
Badminton players at the 1966 British Empire and Commonwealth Games